Ecua is a plant genus in the family Apocynaceae, first described in 1996. It contains only one known species, Ecua moluccensis, endemic to Maluku Province in eastern Indonesia.

References

External links

Monotypic Apocynaceae genera
Endemic flora of the Maluku Islands
Echiteae